Meerzicht is a RandstadRail station in Zoetermeer, the Netherlands.

History

The station opened, as a railway station, on 22 May 1977 as part of the Zoetermeerlijn, operating Zoetermeer Stadslijn services. The train station closed on 3 June 2006 and reopened as a RandstadRail station on 29 October 2007.

The station features 2 platforms. These platforms are low, and the same level as the tram doors, therefore making it step free.

Train services
The following services currently call at Meerzicht:

Bus services
 77 (Centrum West - Voorweg RR - Meerzicht RR - Driemanspolder RR - Dorp RR - Zoetermeer Hoornerhage - Zoetermeer Oosterheem) - Veolia

Gallery

Railway stations opened in 1977
RandstadRail stations in Zoetermeer